The Star is a 1949 Soviet war film directed by Aleksandr Ivanov and starring Anatoly Verbitsky, Alexey Pokrovsky and Oleg Zhakov. The film was completed in 1949, but was not released for four years. It portrays a group of Soviet soldiers who are cut off and surrounded by German troops during the Second World War.

The film was remade in 2002.

Plot
The command of one of the Soviet divisions becomes aware of the alleged enemy counterattack. The scouts sent to the enemy rear to clarify the data do not return. A new group of seven scouts under the code name The Star led by Lieutenant Travkin are sent. When returning after completing the task the group suddenly is faced with the German detachment. Lieutenant Travkin sends one of the scouts with a report, afterwards he and his comrades enter into a mortal battle with the enemy.

Cast
 Anatoly Verbitsky as Group Commander Lieutenant Travkin
 Alexey Pokrovsky as Political Officer Lieutenant Meshcheryakov
 Irina Radchenko as Kate Simakova
 Lidiya Sukharevskaya as Radio operator Tatiana Ulybysheva
 Oleg Zhakov as Colonel Serbichenko
 Movsoum Sanani as Chief of Staff of the Division / Colonel Aliyev
 Nikolay Kryuchkov as Sgt. Mamochkin
 Vasiliy Merkurev as Anikanov
 Pavel Volkov as Scout
 Vladimir Marev as Scout
 Yu Abikh as Scout Yura Golubovsky
 N. Stepanov as Scout Brazhnikov
 Viktor Kulakov as Head of the Division's Intelligence
 Georgy Satini as Degtyarev captain
 Lev Stepanov as German
 Evgeniy Teterin as German General

References

Bibliography 
 Liehm, Mira & Liehm, Antonín J. The Most Important Art: Eastern European Film After 1945. University of California Press, 1977.

External links 
 

1949 films
1949 war films
Soviet war films
1940s Russian-language films
Soviet black-and-white films
Soviet World War II films
Russian World War II films